On May 8, 1822, the last day of the First Session of the 17th Congress, William Milnor (F) of  resigned.  A special election was held to fill the resulting vacancy on October 1, 1822, a week before the general elections for the 18th Congress.

Election results

Forrest took his seat December 2, 1822

See also
List of special elections to the United States House of Representatives

References

Pennsylvania 1822 01
Pennsylvania 1822 01
1822 01
Pennsylvania 01
United States House of Representatives 01
United States House of Representatives 1822 01